The Multan women's cricket team is the women's representative cricket team for Multan. They competed in the National Women's Cricket Championship between 2004–05 and 2017.

History
Multan joined the National Women's Cricket Championship for its inaugural season in 2004–05, beating Faisalabad in the initial knock-out stage before finishing fourth in the final Super League. The side went on to compete in every edition of the National Women's Cricket Championship until it ended in 2017, but did not better their best finish from their first season. They finished second in their group five times in a row between 2006–07 and 2011–12, as well as in 2014.

Players

Notable players
Players who played for Multan and played internationally are listed below, in order of first international appearance (given in brackets):

 Asmavia Iqbal (2005)
 Sania Khan (2009)
 Sukhan Faiz (2009)
 Gull Feroza (2022)

Seasons

National Women's Cricket Championship

Honours
 National Women's Cricket Championship:
 Winners (0):
 Best finish: 4th (2004–05)

See also
 Multan cricket team

References

Women's cricket teams in Pakistan